The Sydney Church of England Grammar School (commonly known as Shore or Shore School) is a dual-campus independent Anglican single-sex and co-educational early learning, primary and secondary day and boarding school for boys, located on the Lower North Shore of Sydney, New South Wales, Australia.

Established in 1889 by the Church of England, Shore has a non-selective enrolment policy and currently caters for approximately 1,600 students from Year K to Year 12, including 200 boarders from Year 6 to Year 12. The school is co-educational from the early learning years to Year 2, and these students are housed on a separate campus in suburban Northbridge.

The school is a member of the Association of Heads of Independent Schools of Australia (AHISA), the Junior School Heads Association of Australia (JSHAA), the Australian Boarding Schools' Association (ABSA), the Headmasters' and Headmistresses' Conference, and is a founding member of the Athletic Association of the Great Public Schools of New South Wales (AAGPS).

History 

The Sydney Church of England Grammar School was founded on 4 May 1889, and was the initiative of Bishop Alfred Barry of the Sydney Diocese of the Church of England, after the closing of the St James School in 1886. The site of the school was chosen by the first Headmaster to be the Victorian mansion of the famed gold prospector Bernhardt Holtermann, a German migrant who discovered the Holtermann Nugget in the Australian gold fields. He used his new-found wealth to build a magnificent home in North Sydney which is now a boarding house of Shore. His sons were among the first students enrolled at Shore.

The St James' School Compensation Trust Act (1886) provided for the foundation of:

The schools colours were drawn from Christs College Cambridge, the college of the first Headmaster along with the schools diagonal stripes. On the crest, the bible and southern cross are placed on the top row, and a shell, representative of the St James School, and the torch, the schools motto on the bottom. The boater, a piece of uniform that has become closely associated with the school, was first encouraged to be worn in 1912, before becoming compulsory in 1924.

The school officially has two names, the "Sydney Church of England Grammar School" and the Shore School has long been known by the latter, however it was not until the early 1990s when the name "The Shore School" was officially adopted. The name came about at sporting matches where supporters could not chant 'Grammar', as this was already done by the students of Sydney Grammar School. Another reason for the name change was that Sydney Church of England Grammar School was shortened to S.C.E.G.S, which sounded similar to S.C.E.G.G.S (Sydney Church of England Girls' Grammar School), the sister school of Shore. The name comes from the school being located in Sydney's North Shore region.

Campuses
The Sydney Church of England Grammar School is situated on two campuses:
 North Sydney [incl. land formerly belonging to "Graythwaite"] (8 ha)
 Northbridge (9 ha) - ELC to Year 2 and sports grounds

North Sydney
In the senior school, in addition to the administrative centres and classroom blocks there are:

 War Memorial Chapel (1915)
 The War Memorial Hall (1953)
Ken and Joan Smith Auditorium (1994)
 BH Travers Centre, including the Boer War Memorial Library and Basketball Courts (2000)
 The Benefactors Building, including the Bob Gowing Museum incorporating the school archives, mainly of the accomplishments of previous headmasters to school academic and extra-curricula achievement. 
 The Centenary Building, including the art department
 Sporting facilities, including one oval, cricket nets, tennis courts, In 2016, the school announced plans for an updated gym, squash courts, basketball court, an indoor/outdoor 50 meter pool and new classrooms as a part of the Shore Physical Education Centre (SPEC). Construction began early 2018, and has completed.

The Preparatory School, originally constructed in 1926, was completely renovated in March 2006.

Northbridge
An Early Learning Centre (ELC) for boys and girls in the two years prior to starting Kindergarten, as well as a Kindergarten to Year 2 learning facility for boys and girls, was opened at the Northbridge campus in 2003. With Long Day Care facilities, the ELC is open 48 weeks per year.

The school's main sports facility is also at Northbridge, on land bought in 1916. The school was given a choice of either buying the neighbouring "Graythwaite" property (the former home of Thomas Allwright Dibbs), or the land at Northbridge. The school chose the land at Northbridge as playing fields, of which the school was in desperate need. This campus now features six full-sized ovals, tennis courts, pavilions and dressing rooms. The grounds were opened in 1919 as a memorial to the 880 old boys who served, and the 122 who died in the Great War.

Northbridge has been redeveloped as the previous grandstands had become severely dilapidated. The $9 million redevelopment includes a new grandstand and changerooms, and was officially opened on 11 November 2008.

Houses

Curriculum

Subjects 
Shore offers a wide variety of subjects. Traditionally the school is most successful in Business studies and Economics; producing 5 state rankings in the past 3 years including first in Business Studies in 2020, as well as Mathematics; producing eighth in 2021, fifth in 2018 and third in 2017 in the Extension 1, and second and sixth in 2022 and first place in NSW in the Extension 2 course in 2017, and Latin; producing 5 state ranking since 2016.

Rankings

Co-curriculum

Sport

Shore students may participate in a variety of sports, mainly within the GPS competition. Sports include rugby union, soccer, cricket, tennis, taekwondo, basketball, rowing, cross country running, athletics, shooting, surf lifesaving, and snowsports. Furthermore, the school is currently trialing new sports such as Australian rules football and hockey.

Until the arrival of Headmaster R.A.I. Grant (1984–2002), the choice of sports available to students was very limited. For example, during the winter months, there was only rugby union unless a medical exemption was available. That changed after 1984, with sports such as tennis and soccer being made available to all students.

The school's boatshed and pontoon for its rowing club is at Gladesville on the north shore of Sydney's Parramatta River. Shore was the third Sydney school to take to the water (after Grammar and Riverview) and has been rowing in the GPS competition since the late 1890s, to great result.

Performing arts
Shore has a comprehensive performing arts program, including Music Ensembles and Drama productions. Music ensembles include two concert bands, two stage bands, an orchestra, three string groups and the Shore Chapel Choir, as well as a number of other smaller ensembles. The Shore Performing Arts Centre features a proscenium arch theatre with 500 seats as well as a hydroluic orchestra pit, counterweight fly system and a state of the art lighting and audio control booth, and a multi-configurable black box theatre with seating arrangements ranging from 25 to 150 seats. The centre also boasts a wide range of orchestral rooms for both performance and rehearsals.

Recent musical productions include Dirty Rotten Scoundrels, Oliver!, West Side Story, Anything Goes, A Peculiar People (World Premier), Les Misérables, How to Succeed in Business Without Really Trying. Recent dramatic productions include Our Town, Lord of the Flies and The Cherry Orchard.

Publications 
The school has a weekly publication, The Shore Weekly Record, which, along with informing boys and parents of upcoming happenings and sporting fixtures and results, gives certain boys the opportunity to express their writing and artistic talents in their own section, usually the inner part of the publication. Over the years this variously-named "inside section" has fostered the satirical talents of Chris Taylor from The Chaser, and provided a unique perspective on the school and the wider world.

Other publications are the Shore Reports (quarterly) and the Torch Bearer (yearly).

Headmasters
After the 2022 decision to dismiss Dr Timothy Peterson seeking renewed leadership, the school has appointed Dr John Collier as interim headmaster.

The school is also governed by a council jointly appointed by the Old Boys' Union and the Anglican Diocese of Sydney. The school has appointed 4 different deputy headmaster's, being MJ Leeds as deputy of academics, Dr AN Mansfield as deputy of operations, RG Dudgeon as deputy of pastoral care and Dr LK Gilmour as deputy of co-curricular activities, replacing the previous deputy headmaster, Rod Morrison, having retired after 5 years as deputy.

The following individuals have served as headmaster of the school:

* denotes interim

Notable alumni

Shore alumni are commonly referred to as 'Old Boys', and may elect to join the schools alumni association, the Shore Old Boys Union. Shore is notable for its strong connections in banking and finance, having produced the current CEO of Challenger Ltd and Chairman of Magellan financial Group, while also having in the past produced CEO's and Chairmen of Bank of New South Wales (Now Westpac), Commercial Banking Company of Sydney (Now NAB), IAG, MLC, Perpetual Limited, Rothschild Australia to name a few. However, some of Shores most notable old boys have come from other walks of life, including:

 16 Rhodes Scholars.
 Famous actor Errol Flynn. 
 Authors: Kenneth Slessor and Russel Braddon.
 Chancellors and Vice Chancellors of ANU (Melville), University of London (Windeyer), University of New England (Wright).
 The media mogul Sir Frank Packer. 
 The founders of; Jim's Mowing, MIRVAC, Nine News, Woolworths.
 Wimbledon Winner and Former world No.1 John Newcombe.
 Wallaby Captains Phil Waugh and David Codey.
 High Court Justices: Sir William Owen, Sir Dudley Williams, Dyson Heydon.
 Governor and Chief Justice of Queensland Sir Alan Mansfield.
 Reserve Bank of Australia Governor's Sir John Grant Phillips, Sir Leslie Melville.
 Minister for foreign Affiars Sir Gordon Freeth.
 Prime Minister Sir John Gorton. 

In 2001, the school was ranked 7th in the Who's Who of boys' school rankings in Australia and Second in New South Wales based on the number of alumni mentioned in Who's Who in Australia.

See also 

 List of Anglican schools in New South Wales
 Anglican education in Australia
 Graythwaite
 List of boarding schools in Australia
 Lawrence Campbell Oratory Competition

References

External links 

 Sydney Church of England Grammar School website
 Shore Old Boys Union website

Boarding schools in New South Wales
Educational institutions established in 1889
SHORE
Anglican secondary schools in Sydney
Member schools of the Headmasters' and Headmistresses' Conference
Boys' schools in New South Wales
Junior School Heads Association of Australia Member Schools
North Sydney, New South Wales
Anglican primary schools in Sydney
1889 establishments in Australia